The Dnieper reservoir cascade or Dnieper cascade of hydroelectric power stations is a series of dams, reservoirs and hydroelectric power stations on the Dnieper river in Ukraine. It was created to prevent uncontrolled flooding and improve water transportation infrastructure. Coordination and operation of all dams on the Dnieper is conducted by government company Ukrhydroenergo. In 1970, the Kyiv dam partially prevented flooding in comparison with the 1931 Kyiv flooding.

As with any dam, the water reservoirs of the Dnieper in Ukraine pose a significant threat of a large-scale, human-made disaster if their dams fail. Those concerns were raised in particular in connection with the 2009 Sayano–Shushenskaya Dam disaster.

To combat uncontrolled flooding, the National Academy of Sciences of Ukraine had developed a program of flooding forecasting; however, as of 2012, the Government of Ukraine refused to adopt it.

Infrastructure

Power stations and dams
From source to mouth:
 Kyiv Hydroelectric Station
 Kyiv Hydro-Accumulating Power Station
 Kaniv Hydroelectric Station
 Kremenchuk Hydroelectric Station
 Middle Dnieper Hydroelectric Power Plant
 Dnieper Hydroelectric Station
 Kakhovka Hydroelectric Station

Water reservoirs
From source to mouth:
 Kyiv
 Kaniv
 Kremenchuk
 Kamianske
 Dnieper
 Kakhovka

Concerns

Like other reservoirs, Dnieper reservoirs pose a potential threat of causing major flooding if their dams fail. Such damage may be inflicted by a powerful natural disaster (e.g., an earthquake), a human-made disaster, or a deliberate attack by terrorists or enemy (or even own military) forces at war.

The Dnieper reservoirs contain an additional major threat—after the Chernobyl Nuclear Disaster in 1986, radionuclides washed away by rains badly contaminated the bottom silt of the Kyiv Reservoir and presumably the others. During the years following the disaster, there were suggestions to drain the Kyiv Reservoir because it was too shallow.

The dams are supposed to be strong enough to survive natural and terrorist threats. Both their construction schemes and government efforts work towards this goal. For instance, some engineers guarantee that every Dnieper dam will survive an earthquake (to its typical regional extent), meteorite or aircraft falling. There are also countermeasures against overflooding and malfunction of dams. Authorities pay significant attention to safeguarding the dams and bridges by special units of the Ministry of Internal Affairs and other security agencies.

A failure of the Kyiv Reservoir would cause a flooding of the low-lying areas of Kyiv, mainly densely populated residential neighborhoods. The aftermath of a possible complex flooding also include the spread of radioactive material from the Chernobyl disaster contained in the reservoirs, the widespread contamination by industrial and urban wastes and creation of swamps on bottoms of emptied reservoirs.

In 2001–03 the Security Service of Ukraine organized exercises on the Kyiv Hydroelectric station, simulating a possible terrorist attack. The results of the exercises were considered satisfactory.

Government position
New concerns arose in 2005 after a fake terrorist threat case. A police officer, dissatisfied with his commanders, anonymously called an emergency line stating that he had planted a bomb in a cargo train crossing the Kyiv Reservoir's dam. An immediate check proved the threat to be fake and the officer was arrested. Regardless, the incident caused another wave of public concern.

In 2012, the former Kyiv Hydroelectric Power Plant manager and veteran stated that the dam is guaranteed to be capable of withstanding any physical threat except for a large space object impact or a deliberate military attack of significant scale. However, an emergency plan exists to safely minimize consequences of a space impact depending on if there would be early warning of the impact event.

See also
 Dam failure
 Dam safety system
 Dnieper
 Dnieper Hydroelectric Station

News media
 “Комсомольская правда” об угрозах плотины Киевской ГЭС и водохранилища 
 “Аргументы и факты” о реальных угрозах дамбы Киевского водохранилища и ГЭС  
 "Известия" о проблематике плотины Киевского водохранилища и ГЭС
 Эксперт УНИАН об угрозах дамбы Киевского водохранилища

References
Notes

Bibliography
  "The strange initiative", Kievskiye Vedomosti, January 31, 2002
  Chernovetsky will check "the most dangerous place on the planet", Korrespondent.net, July 19, 2006
 “Комсомольская правда” об угрозах плотины Киевской ГЭС и водохранилища  
 “Аргументы и факты” о реальных угрозах дамбы Киевского водохранилища и ГЭС  
 “Известия” о проблематике плотины Киевского водохранилища и ГЭС 
 Эксперт УНИАН об угрозах дамбы Киевского водохранилища

External links
 Battle of Chernobyl: The Consequences - details about the radioactive contamination
 Prymak, K. Dnieper Cascade of HES. Ukrainian Soviet Encyclopedia
 Chernousenko, O. HES Cascades (Каскади ГЕС). Power Generation: history, modernity, future.
 Dnipro Cascade of Hydroelectric Stations. Encyclopedia of Ukraine
 The 1970 flooding in Kyiv. Istorychna Pravda (Ukrayinska Pravda).
 Parnikoza, I. History of formation and structure of Dnieper valley near Kyiv (Історія формування та будова долини Дніпра у Києві). Kyiv islands and river embankment of Dnieper, view through the ages.
 Tetiana Stetsenko. Is there threat to Cherkasy residents from the Dnieper Cascade (Чи загрожує черкащанам Дніпровський каскад?). Cherkasy 24. 30 November 2018.